Agneepath or Agnipath may refer to:
 "Agnipath", a Hindi poem by Harivansh Rai Bachchan
 Agneepath (1990 film), a 1990 Indian film by Mukul Anand, titled after the poem, starring Amitabh Bachchan
 Agneepath (2012 film), a 2012 Indian film by Karan Malhotra, remake of the 1990 film starring Hrithik Roshan and Sanjay Dutt
 Agneepath (soundtrack), soundtrack album of the 2012 film
 Agneepath (TV series), an Indian television soap opera
 Agnipath Scheme, Indian military recruitment scheme
 Agnipath Meri Atmakatha, Hindi translation of In the Line of Fire: A Memoir, 2006 autobiography by former President of Pakistan Pervez Musharraf